Pol Moya Betriu (born 9 December 1996) is an Andorran middle-distance runner competing primarily in the 800 metres. He represented his country at the 2016 World Indoor Championships without qualifying for the final. He is the national record holder on several distances.

Moya represented Andorra at the 2016 Summer Olympics, but did not qualify for the final. He was the flag bearer for Andorra for the closing ceremonies.

Moya was born in Andorra to Spanish parents. He is studying at the Polytechnic University of Catalonia.

Competition record

Personal bests
Outdoor
800 metres – 1:48.75 (Barcelona 2016)
1000 metres – 2:27.20 (Barcelona 2015)
Indoor
800 metres – 1:49.84 (Madrid 2016) NR
1500 metres – 3:42.23 (Istanbul 2023) NR

Notes

References

External links
 
 
 
 

1996 births
Living people
Andorran male middle-distance runners
Athletes (track and field) at the 2016 Summer Olympics
Olympic athletes of Andorra
World Athletics Championships athletes for Andorra
Athletes (track and field) at the 2018 Mediterranean Games
Athletes (track and field) at the 2022 Mediterranean Games
Mediterranean Games competitors for Andorra
People from La Seu d'Urgell
Sportspeople from the Province of Lleida
Athletes (track and field) at the 2020 Summer Olympics